Roman Pritt is an American Samoan rugby league player for the Washington DC Slayers in the USA Rugby League and previously for the Northern Virginia Eagles and Jacksonville Axemen. His position is at prop. He has played American Football for the Bemidji Axemen, Louisiana Swashbucklers and Richmond Raiders.

References

External links
Roman Pritt Bemidji Axemen profile

American Samoan rugby league players
American sportspeople of Samoan descent
Bemidji Axemen players
Footballers who switched code
Jacksonville Axemen players
Living people
Louisiana Swashbucklers players
Northern Virginia Eagles players
Players of American football from American Samoa
Richmond Raiders players
Rugby league props
Washington DC Slayers players
Year of birth missing (living people)